Harry Mink O'Neill (May 8, 1917 – March 6, 1945) was an American professional baseball player who appeared in one game for the Philadelphia Athletics in , as a catcher. O'Neill and Elmer Gedeon were the only two Major League Baseball players killed during World War II.

Collegiate athletics 
O'Neill distinguished himself as a very gifted college athlete. At Gettysburg College, the 6-foot-3, 205-pounder sometimes called "Porkie,"  led the school's baseball, football and basketball teams to league championships. After graduation, he was the subject of a bidding war between two American League teams, eventually signing with his hometown Athletics.

Major league appearance 

As the third-string catcher for the Athletics, O'Neill appeared in just one game, as a late-inning defensive replacement.  In a lopsided road loss to the Detroit Tigers on July 23, 1939, O'Neill caught the bottom of the 8th inning, and did not have a plate appearance.

Military service and death in World War II 
Following his time with the Athletics, O'Neill played in 16 games with the minor league Harrisburg Senators and also played semi-pro basketball and football.  After the outbreak of World War II, O'Neill enlisted in the United States Marine Corps in 1942, and rose to the rank of first lieutenant with the Weapons Company, 25th Marine Regiment, 4th Marine Division. In January 1944, he took part in the amphibious assault on Kwajalein. On June 16, 1944, the second day of the Battle of Saipan, he was wounded in the shoulder by shrapnel, then treated for weeks back in the US. He returned to active duty in July, in time to participate in the Battle of Tinian. He was killed by a sniper at Iwo Jima on March 6, 1945. Among his surviving family was his young wife, Ethel McKay O'Neill.

Legacy 
Of the 500-plus major league players who served in the military in World War II, O'Neill and Elmer Gedeon were the only players killed, both at age 27. The two have become symbols of "baseball's sacrifice" in the war effort. As the National Baseball Hall of Fame and Museum proclaims: "Ballplayers, like every other American citizen, understand the importance of giving one's self for their country." In 1980, O'Neill was inducted into Gettysburg College's Hall of Athletic Honor for baseball, football and basketball.

See also
List of baseball players who died during their careers

References

Further reading

External links

1917 births
1945 deaths
United States Marine Corps personnel killed in World War II
Burials at Arlington Cemetery (Pennsylvania)
Major League Baseball catchers
Baseball players from Philadelphia
Basketball players from Philadelphia
Players of American football from Philadelphia
Battle of Iwo Jima
Gettysburg Bullets baseball players
Gettysburg Bullets football players
Gettysburg Bullets men's basketball players
Philadelphia Athletics players
United States Marine Corps officers
American men's basketball players
Harrisburg Senators players
Deaths by firearm in Japan